Sandane is the administrative centre of the municipality of Gloppen in Vestland county, Norway. It is located at the end of the Gloppefjorden, along the European route E39 highway. Sandane has several suburban areas that surround the nearby fjord such as Sørstranda to the west and Vereide to the northwest.

The Firda Upper Secondary School and Sandane Church are both located in Sandane. Sandane is located close to the lake Breimsvatn, the Myklebustbreen glacier, and Jostedalsbreen National Park.

Culture
The Glopperock festival has been held in Sandane since 1980.

References

External links

Villages in Vestland
Gloppen